{{Infobox person
| name               = Anne Phelan
| honorific-suffix   = 
| image              = 
| birth_name         = Anne Mary Phelan
| birth_date         = 2 August 
| birth_place        = Melbourne, Victoria, Australia
| death_date         =  (aged 71)
| death_place        = Bendigo, Victoria, Australia
| years_active       = 1968–2019
| credits            = {{hlist|Bellbird|Prisoner|Neighbours|Something in the Air}}
| spouse             = 
| children           = 
| website            = 
| restingplacecoordinates = 
}}
Anne Mary Phelan  (2 August 1948 – 27 October 2019) was an Australian actress of stage and screen who appeared in many theatre, television and film productions as well as radio and voice-over. 

Her television soap opera roles included  Bellbird as Kate Ashwood, in Prisoner (1980–1985) as Myra Desmond  and Monica Taylor in Something in the Air (2000–2002) as Monica Taylor, for which she won the 2000 AFI (AACTA) Award for Best Actress in a Television Drama, having previously won the 1988 AFI Award for Best Actress in a Miniseries for Poor Man's Orange. 

She received the Equity Lifetime Achievement Award in 2016. She was also an activist for humanitarian causes.

Early life
Phelan was raised in Fitzroy, Victoria. She was reported as saying that she had no formal study or qualifications for acting or singing, but instead had trained through 15 years work in amateur theatre. Aged 16, she became pregnant and gave her daughter up for adoption, seeing her again for the first time 50 years later.

Career
Phelan began her television career in 1968. She had an ongoing role in the soap opera Bellbird as Kate Ashwood in the early 1970s.

In the late 1970s, she played guest roles in Prisoner. She took the role of Officer Manson, appearing in one episode of the series in 1979. This character had the sole purpose of threatening to resign over the favourable treatment afforded to prisoner Barbara Davidson in episode 17. Later in 1979, Phelan reappeared in the series, this time playing the role of dopey prisoner Bernadette in a number of episodes.

She first appeared in Prisoner on a recurring basis as Myra Desmond between 1980 and 1983; Myra was then reintroduced to the series in early 1984 as a regular character and Phelan continued in the role for a further 18 months.

Phelan's other soap roles included Starting Out (1983), Family and Friends (1990) and Something in the Air (2000–2002). She made guest starring appearances in many drama series, including The Flying Doctors and Blue Heelers. She was also a regular on Marshall Law and appeared in the ABC comedy Mother and Son playing the role of a social worker who befriends Maggie Beare.

She also made two guest appearances in Neighbours. The first, in 1997, was as the character of Claudia Harvey and the second, in 2004, was as Doreen "Peace Dove" Cassidy.

In 2007, Phelan appeared in episode 6 of The Librarians as a prisoner with the Prisoner theme song.

In 2012, Phelan joined the cast of comedy drama Winners & Losers in the ongoing role of Dot Gross. Winners & Losers marked her first regular role in 10 years. Prior to this, she had appeared in several theatre productions and made various television guest appearances.

Community work
Phelan was a public speaker and a recipient of Regional Arts Victoria's Don Mackay Award (2006) for Outstanding Achievement in Regional Touring.

From 2000, she was the patron of Positive Women (Victoria), a support and advocacy group run by and for women living with HIV. She received the Oz Showbiz Cares / Equity Fights AIDS 2002 Activist of the Year Award for outstanding contribution to the fight against HIV/AIDS.

She performed and sang with the Choir of Hard Knocks on Melbourne's streets in 2006, busking to raise money for a performance at the Melbourne Town Hall. She was a member of Actors For Refugees, a group of performers who volunteer their time and talent to tell the stories of Australia's refugees and asylum seekers. She was an ambassador for Alzheimer's Australia Vic, educators, advocates and spokespeople for those living with dementia, their families and friends and those who support them.

Death
Phelan died of natural causes on 27 October 2019. She was 71 at her time of death, although, some sources have stated her age as 75. She was privately cremated.

Filmography

 Stage 

Other work
Radio and voice
 ABC Book readings include: Down by the Dockside and The Harp in the South Serials and plays including the production of the one-woman-play Dream Kitchen Narrator for Visions of Yankalilla, a documentary for Flaming Star Pictures and the documentary series Grey Voyagers, for SBS
 TV monologue – The Agony and the Ecstasy, for the ABC

Theatre restaurant, live variety, revue
 Cinderella – An Adult Pantomime (Capers Dinner Theatre)
 Sweet Fanny Adams
 Tikki and John's Theatre Restaurant
 The Glitter Sisters (original 14-month Melbourne season)

Corporate
 Anti-Cancer Council Breast Health Video

Awards and honours

Honours 
Medal of the Order of Australia (OAM) in the 2007 Queen's Birthday Honours list for service to the arts as an actress, and to the community, particularly through support for women living with the HIV virus and for asylum seekers and refugees.
Inducted into the Victorian Honour Roll of Women in 2008.
Included in Who's Who in Australia'' since 2006.

Awards and nominations

References

External links
 

1948 births
2019 deaths
AACTA Award winners
Australian film actresses
Australian radio actresses
Australian soap opera actresses
Australian stage actresses
Actresses from Melbourne
Recipients of the Medal of the Order of Australia
20th-century Australian actresses
21st-century Australian actresses
People from Fitzroy, Victoria